The 2000 United States presidential election in Montana took place on November 7, 2000, and was part of the 2000 United States presidential election. Voters chose three electors to the Electoral College, who voted for president and vice president.

Montana was won by Governor George W. Bush. Bush won most of the counties in the state, and only obtained less than 40% in three counties. Bush won the highest populated county, Yellowstone County with exactly 59% of the vote. Gore won a total of five counties, and did the best in Deer Lodge County.

Ralph Nader, the Green party nominee, performed very well here, getting 5.95% of the vote statewide. He did very well in the western part of the state, getting over 5% of the vote in most of the counties in the region. His best performance by far was in Missoula County, where he got over 15% of the vote, which was the only county Nader cracked double digits. Nader's performance in Montana made it his fifth strongest state after Alaska, Vermont, Massachusetts and Rhode Island.

, this is the last election in which Missoula County voted for the Republican candidate. Al Gore's 33.4% of the vote was the worst performance for a Democrat in Montana since Jimmy Carter in 1980, and no Democrat has fallen under that number since. Gore's margin of loss is the largest for a Democrat in Montana since James M. Cox in 1920.  

Montana was 1 of 14 states to be carried at least once by Bill Clinton (whom at the time of the election, Gore was the sitting VP under Clinton) during the elections of 1992 and 1996 (having won the state in 1992) that Gore lost.

Results

By county

Counties that flipped from Democratic to Republican
Blaine (Largest city: Chinook)
Cascade (Largest city: Great Falls)
Dawson (Largest city: Glendive)
Hill (Largest city: Havre)
Mineral (Largest city: Superior)
Missoula (Largest city: Missoula)
Rosebud (Largest city: Colstrip)
Sheridan (Largest city: Plentywood)

By congressional district
Due to the state's low population, only one congressional district is allocated. This district, called the At-Large district, because it covers the entire state, and thus is equivalent to the statewide election results.

Electors

Technically the voters of Montana cast their ballots for electors: representatives to the Electoral College. Montana is allocated 3 electors because it has 1 congressional districts and 2 senators. All candidates who appear on the ballot or qualify to receive write-in votes must submit a list of 3 electors, who pledge to vote for their candidate and his or her running mate. Whoever wins the majority of votes in the state is awarded all 3 electoral votes. Their chosen electors then vote for president and vice president. Although electors are pledged to their candidate and running mate, they are not obligated to vote for them. An elector who votes for someone other than his or her candidate is known as a faithless elector.

The electors of each state and the District of Columbia met on December 18, 2000 to cast their votes for president and vice president. The Electoral College itself never meets as one body. Instead the electors from each state and the District of Columbia met in their respective capitols.

The following were the members of the Electoral College from the state. All were pledged to and voted for George W. Bush and Dick Cheney:
Thelma Baker
Jack Galt
Tillie Pierce

See also
 United States presidential elections in Montana
 Presidency of George W. Bush

References

Montana
2000 Montana elections
2000